A shikla or shakila (Arabic : شكيلة), also known under the name alama (Arabic : علامة) is a piece of clothing that the Jews of Tunisia were forced to wear to distinguish themselves from Muslim residents. The shikla was primarily worn during the Almohad Caliphate between the end of the 12th century and the middle of the 19th century.

Etymology 
The word comes from the Jewish surname Bou Shikla, which signifies "one who wears a ring".

History 
With the arrival of the Banu Hilal to Kairouan in the 12th century, the Jewish community in the area began to face discrimination and intolerance from their new rulers.  While Jews and Christians benefited from increased rights under the Fatimids, the same rights were not provided under the Banu Hilal. The new rulers argued that while the hadith in which the prophet Muhammad allowed freedom of religion for People of the Book (ahl al-kitâb); the rule was only in place for a period of 500 years after the Hijrah, which coincided with the year 1107, the date when the Jews of Medina told Muhammad that the Messiah would arrive. The date had long since passed when the Almohad Caliphate settled in Ifriqiya, allowing the new rulers to say there was no longer a reason to keep those privileges for dhimmis.

Among the numerous obligations that Jews suffered with was the obligation of wearing a Shikla, on the order of Abu Yusuf Yaqub al-Mansur in 1198, to be able to distinguish them from Muslim citizens and forbid them from certain places, occupations and events. Even Jews who converted to Islam were forced to wear the distinctive headpiece.

The Jews continued to wear the Shikla in Tunisia until the creation of the Pacte fondamental (which removed dhimmi status) following the decree of Mohammed Bey on 14 September 1858. The pact not only abolished the clothing but allowed Jews to wear the Red Chéchia headpiece like the rest of Tunisians. Ibn Abi Dhiaf wrote about the decision:

Description 
The requirements for the shikla varied with the different dynasties that ruled over Tunisia. The main goal was simply to distinguish and humiliate Jews in public spaces.

Under the reign of the Almohad Caliphate, it was principally a turban dyed yellow at the end. Jewish converts to Islam were forced to wear a long dark blue tunic with sleeves so large they reached ones' feet, and a skullcap in place of a turban.

During the Ottoman rule of Tunisia, the Twansa Jewish community put on black bonnets while the Granas preferred more European headgear to avoid being confused with the indigenous Twansa.

See also 
 Yellow badge

References 

Jewish Tunisian history
Antisemitism in Tunisia
Islam and antisemitism
Almohad Caliphate
Disabilities (Jewish)